Exelastis caroli is a moth of the family Pterophoroidea. It is found in Kenya, inhabiting the coastal dunes.

The wingspan is 14–19 mm. The moth flies in March.

References

External links 
 Ten new species of Afrotropical Pterophoridae (Lepidoptera)

Endemic moths of Kenya
Exelastini
Moths of Africa
Moths described in 2008
Taxa named by Cees Gielis